Baron Yuasa Kurahei (湯浅 倉平, February 1, 1874 – December 24, 1940) was a Japanese politician and bureaucrat. He served as Lord Keeper of the Privy Seal of Japan (1936-1940), Minister of the Imperial Household (1933-1936), Inspector-General of Korea (1925-1927) and President of the Board of Audit (1929-1933). He was a member of the House of Peers from 1916 to 1929. He held the court rank of Senior Second Rank.

Biography

Early life and family 
Ishikawa Kurahei was born on February 1, 1874, in Uka, Toyoura, Yamaguchi Prefecture (present-day Shimonoseki, Yamaguchi Prefecture), the second son of doctor Ishikawa Kōan and his wife Ichi. The Ishikawa family had been doctors and prominent village headmen of Uka for generations; Ishikawa's eldest daughter Tomoko had married Prime Minister Yamagata Aritomo in 1867, and the family was later involved in the management of Mitsui Bank and served as mayor of Shimonoseki. Kurahei's family moved to Kōriyama, Fukushima Prefecture after his elder brother Tamenoshin opened a hospital there. In 1884, his name was changed to Yuasa Kurahei after his father was adopted by shizoku Yuasa Hisatsuchi of Fukushima Prefecture.

His higher education was financed by his brother Tamenoshin. He studied politics at Tokyo Imperial University, graduating in July 1898.

Career 
He entered the Home Ministry on July 15, 1898, immediately after graduation.

After serving as Governor of Yamaguchi Prefecture in 1913 and Governor of Shizuoka Prefecture in 1914, he was appointed Head of Home Ministry Police Affairs Bureau in 1915 through a recommendation by Minister of Home Affairs Ichiki Kitokurō, a university era friend.

Yuasa was elected a member of the House of Peers on October 5, 1916, and served until October 22, 1929.

On September 5, 1923, after the Great Kantō earthquake, he was appointed Superintendent General of the Japanese Police and was in charge of the safety and aiding the disaster victims in the aftermath of the earthquake.

Yuasa was appointed Vice-Minister of Home Affairs under the Katō Cabinet in June 1924.

On December 3, 1925, he was appointed the 5th Inspector-General of Korea, serving until December 1927 in Keijō, Chōsen (present-day Seoul, Korea).

Yuasa was appointed Minister of the Imperial Household on February 15, 1933. The appointment was unprecedented as Yuasa had not been Minister of State, and Ichiki Kitokurō and former Governor-General of Chōsen Saitō Makoto are believed to have played a role in the appointment.

When the February 26 incident occurred, without delay, Yuasa visited the Imperial Palace and played a central role in the aftermath processing of the incident. He succeeded as Lord Keeper of the Privy Seal of Japan on March 6, 1936, after Saitō Makoto was assassinated during the incident.

On June 1, 1940, Yuasa was forced to resign as Lord Keeper of the Privy Seal of Japan due to his deteriorating health. Upon resigning, he received the court rank of Senior Second Rank and zenkan reigū (the privileges of one's former post). He received First Class Order of the Rising Sun with Paulownia Flowers on June 7, 1940.

Yuasa died from pulmonary emphysema on December 24, 1940, in Ushigome, Tokyo, aged 66. Right before his death, on the same day, he conferred the title of baron. However, the baronetcy was extinct upon his death as the heir presumptive was a female household head, his wife. He was buried at Zendō-ji temple in Kōriyama, Fukushima Prefecture.

Family 
Yuasa's eldest daughter married diplomat and Governor-General of Chōsen bureaucrat Tsutomu Suwa.

His nephew Daitarō Yuasa was Director of Jusendō Hospital and helped establish the Kōriyama City Library.

Gallery

References 

Japanese politicians
Members of the Government-General of Korea
University of Tokyo alumni
People from Yamaguchi Prefecture
1874 births
1940 deaths